The Tarjeta de Movilidad Integrada (MI; literal English translation: Integrated Mobility Card) is a contactless smart card introduced in Mexico City in October 2005 as "Tarjeta Metrobús". It is used on the public transport system of the Mexico City as a fare card. It offers interoperability with the Metro, Metrobús, Ecobici, Cablebús, Light train, RTP and Trolleybus systems.

Background 
In 1986, the Mexico City Government (then called Distrito Federal), implemented a plastic card called Abono for the STC Metr, this card was used similarly to the paper ticket used but with the difference that it could be reused multiple times, unlike the paper ticket that was usable only once. The card was sold from 1986 until its discontinuation in 1995. 

Pilot programs for a card that could work with all of the city's transport system started in October 2005 with the STC Metro for users that are exempted from paying to access the system (STC employees, users with evident disabilities and users over 70). The first card that was available to the general public that served the all-in-one features was released on June 17, 2006.

Tarjeta Metrobús 

On June 19, 2005, the first line of the Metrobús system was opened to the public. The service used a pre-paid contactless card called "Tarjeta Metrobús" that to be top-up by the user at top-up stations.

All Tarjeta Metrobús cards remained valid until February 21, 2020.

Tarjeta Distrito Federal (TDF) 

On October 17, 2012, the Tarjeta Distrito Federal (literal English translation: Federal District Card) was released along the inauguration of the 12th line of the Mexico City Metro, a line that can only be accessed with the card. In 2016, the then governor Miguel Ángel Mancera renamed the card to Tarjeta CDMX after the Federal District was renamed to Mexico City.

The card was discontinued on January 30, 2020, with all TDF cards remaining valid until January 31, 2020. They were replaced with the Tarjeta de Movilidad Integrada.

Uses 
The Integrated Movility card is used by most of the official transportation systems in Mexico City.

References 

Transportation in Mexico City
Contactless smart cards